The under secretary of defense (comptroller)/chief financial officer, abbreviated USD(C)/CFO, is a high level civilian official in the United States Department of Defense. The Under Secretary of Defense (Comptroller) is the principal staff assistant and adviser to both the Secretary of Defense and the Deputy Secretary of Defense for all budgetary and fiscal matters, including the development and execution of the Defense Department's annual budget.

The Under Secretary is appointed by the president and confirmed by the United States Senate to serve at the pleasure of the president.

The position of Defense Department Comptroller was originally at the rank of Assistant Secretary until the National Defense Authorization Act of 1995 upgraded the position to its current rank of Under Secretary.

Overview
The Office of the Under Secretary of Defense (Comptroller)/CFO is the principal staff office for the Defense Department on all budgetary and fiscal matters, including the development and execution of the Defense Department's annual budget of more than $700 billion. As Chief Financial Officer, the Under Secretary's Office also oversees the Department's financial policy, financial management systems, and business modernization efforts.

The Under Secretary is chair of the Financial Management Modernization Executive Committee, which has the goal of making sure that each of the Department of Defense's critical accounting, financial, and data feeder systems are compliant with applicable federal financial management and reporting requirements. The Comptroller is also a member of the Defense Business System Management Committee.

With the rank of Under Secretary, the USD(C) is a Level III position within the Executive Schedule. Since January 2019, the annual rate of pay for Level III is $176,900.

Reporting officials
Officials reporting to the USD(C) include:
Deputy Under Secretary of Defense (Comptroller)
Director, Defense Contract Audit Agency
Director, Defense Finance and Accounting Service
Director, Resource Issues
Deputy Comptroller (Budget and Appropriation Affairs)
Deputy Comptroller (Program/Budget)
Deputy Chief Financial Officer
Director, Human Capital and Resource Management

The Deputy Under Secretary of Defense (Comptroller), abbreviated DUSD(C), is the USD(C)'s chief deputy and assumes the duties of the USD(C) in his or her absence. Pursuant to Public Law 111-84, the DUSD(C) is appointed from civilian life by the president of the United States with the consent of the Senate.

Budget

Budget totals
The annual budget for the USD(C) is contained in the Office of the Secretary of Defense's (OSD) budget, under the Defense-Wide Operation and Maintenance (O&M) account.

Budget features
Comptroller Initiatives - Support for producing and providing senior Department leadership with authoritative, accurate, and timely financial statements and support Department-wide business transformation efforts by improving financial management processes, systems, and financial reporting. This funding appears to support the programs of the Defense Contract Audit Agency and the Defense Finance and Accounting Service.
Future Years Defense Program (FYDP) Improvement - Maintain the FYDP information system used to collect, transform, disseminate, build reports, and provide analytical displays for planning, programming, budgeting, and execution activities
Administrative Support - Funds services including general office support, data administration, records management, workflow and correspondence tracking, and other administrative tasks
Capabilities Portfolio Management (CPM) - Funds OSD and Joint programs used to advise senior Department leadership and support strategic decision making to optimize investments and minimize risks in providing capabilities to the Warfighter. CPM includes programs such as Command & Control, Joint Logistics, Net Centric Operations, Corporate Management Support, and Battlespace Awareness
Next Generation Resource Management System (NGRMS) - Maintain IT system used to formulate, justify, present, and defend the DoD budget, including equipment maintenance support, software upgrades, and software licenses
Enterprise Funds Distribution System Support (EFDSS) - Maintain IT system used for controlling and distributing funds, including equipment maintenance support, software upgrades, and software licenses
Travel - Funds employee travel in support of the OUSD(C) mission

Office holders

The table below includes both the various titles of this post over time, as well as all the holders of those offices.

References

External links
 comptroller.defense.gov